Francesco Remotti (born 6 June 1943 in Pozzolo Formigaro) is an Italian anthropologist. He is a lecturer and heads the Department of Anthropology at the University of Turin.

Works
Noi, primitivi. Lo specchio dell’antropologia (Torino 1990)
Luoghi e corpi (Torino 1993)
Contro l’identità (Roma-Bari 1996)
Prima lezione di antropologia (Roma-Bari 2000)
Centri di potere. Capitali e città nell’Africa precoloniale (Torino 2005).

External links
Modulo Dipartimento di Sociologia e Ricerca Sociale - Didattica 
Il Senso di Tiempo: Biography of Remotti

1943 births
Living people
People from the Province of Alessandria
Italian anthropologists
Academic staff of the University of Turin